Espírito Santo do Pinhal (Portuguese meaning "Holy Spirit of Pinhal") is a municipality in the state of São Paulo in Brazil. The population in 2020 is 44,471 (IBGE 2020) and the area is 389 km². The elevation is 870 m.

Notable people
Sebastião da Silveira Cintra

References

Municipalities in São Paulo (state)